The following is a List of New Mexico State Bike Routes. These routes are designated by the New Mexico Department of Transportation.


List of routes

State Bike Route 1

New Mexico State Bike Route 1 exists within three separate segments. These segments connect La Mesilla and San Miguel, Belen and Bernardo, and Taos and the Colorado border.

State Bike Route 2

New Mexico State Bike Route 2 runs along New Mexico State Road 38 between Questa and the end of the shoulder.

State Bike Route 5

New Mexico State Bike Route 5 runs through northwestern New Mexico, connecting Rio Rancho to Cuba along New Mexico State Road 528 and U.S. Route 550.

State Bike Route 7

New Mexico State Bike Route 7 exists in four segments along U.S. Route 70 in New Mexico, running between Las Cruces and Organ, Tularosa and Hondo, within Roswell, and between Kenna and Clovis.

State Bike Route 9

New Mexico State Bike Route 9 exists within three separate segments. These segments connect Stanley and Estancia, Tesque Village and Lamy, and Espanola and Ojo Caliente.

State Bike Route 9A

New Mexico State Bike Route 9A is a spur of Bike Route 9 into Abiquiú.

State Bike Route 12

New Mexico State Bike Route 12 runs through the Manzanita Mountains on New Mexico State Road 337 near Tijeras.

State Bike Route 14

New Mexico State Bike Route 14 runs between Tijeras and Sandia Park along the Turquoise Trail.

State Bike Route 15

New Mexico State Bike Route 15 exists in four segments in eastern New Mexico. The segments run between Carlsbad and Roswell, Fort Sumner and Santa Rosa, Las Vegas and Sapello, and Black Lake and Angel Fire.

State Bike Route 18

New Mexico State Bike Route 18 runs from Cliff to Deming along U.S. Route 180.

State Bike Route 20

New Mexico State Bike Route 20 runs from Anthony east to the Texas border along New Mexico State Road 404 and New Mexico State Road 213.

State Bike Route 53

New Mexico State Bike Route 53 runs from Grants to Malpais Information Center along New Mexico State Road 53.

State Bike Route 66

New Mexico State Bike Route 66 runs along two sections of U.S. Route 66. The segments run between Milan and New Mexico State Road 117 and Albuquerque and Tijeras.

State Bike Route 547

New Mexico State Bike Route 547 runs along New Mexico State Road 547 in Grants.

References

Bike paths in New Mexico